KCEP (88.1 MHz) is a non-commercial FM radio station located in Las Vegas, Nevada.  KCEP airs an urban contemporary music format branded as "Power 88".  Its studios are in Las Vegas and its transmitter is on Black Mountain in Henderson.

KCEP for years has been able to thrive in the Las Vegas market serving the African American community since its launch on October 7, 1972.  The station under its format plays R&B, Hip Hop, Classic Soul, Old School, Gospel and Jazz.  Under this rubric music selection, KCEP has been a non-commercial alternative to Las Vegas' mainstream commercial stations that play similar music such as KVEG, KLUC and KOAS currently.   (KPLV and KVGS formerly had former such formats in the 2000s.)

As of May 2010, it is the affiliate for the syndicated Michael Baisden show in the afternoons. Other syndicated programming includes the Bobby Jones Gospel Countdown from AURN and Tell Me More with Michel Martin from NPR.

History
The owners of KCEP, the Economic Opportunity Board of Clark County (or EOBCC), a Community Action Agency, leased Westside School in 1975 and began a major restoration. The old schoolhouse, which is listed in the National Register of Historic Places, houses KCEP and EOBCC.

In the mid-1980s, future hitmaker and pop singer Dino served as programming director.

See also
List of community radio stations in the United States

References

External links
Official Website
EOB of Clark County

CEP
Urban contemporary radio stations in the United States
NPR member stations
Radio stations established in 1973
1973 establishments in Nevada
Community radio stations in the United States